Hajjiabad (also Romanized as Ḩājjīābād; also known as Ḩājī Tāb, Ḩājj ‘Alī Beyk, and Ḩājjī Tāb) is a village in Qaleh-ye Mozaffari Rural District, in the Central District of Selseleh County, Lorestan Province, Iran. At the 2006 census, its population was 34, in 8 families.

References 

Towns and villages in Selseleh County